Blažo Lalević (Cyrillic: Блажо Лалевић; born 11 May 1984) is a Montenegrin football midfielder, who currently plays for Icelandic side Leiknir Fáskrúðsfjörður.

External links
 Blažo Lalević at Srbijafudbal
 

1982 births
Living people
People from Tivat
Association football midfielders
Montenegrin footballers
FK Crvenka players
FK Hajduk Kula players
FK Radnički Sombor players
FK Mladost Apatin players
FK Inđija players
FK Timok players
FK BSK Borča players
Íþróttafélagið Huginn players
Serbian SuperLiga players
Serbian First League players
1. deild karla players
Montenegrin expatriate footballers
Expatriate footballers in Serbia
Montenegrin expatriate sportspeople in Serbia
Expatriate footballers in Iceland